The 1990 Saxony state election was held on 14 October 1990 to elect the members of the first Landtag of Saxony. It was the first election held in Saxony since the reunification of Germany, which took place on 3 October. The Christian Democratic Union (CDU) led by Kurt Biedenkopf dominated the election with 53.8% of the vote, followed by the Social Democratic Party (SPD) with 19.1%. Biedenkopf subsequently became Saxony's first post-reunification Minister-President.

Parties
The table below lists parties which won seats in the election.

Election result

|-
! colspan="2" | Party
! Votes
! %
! Seats 
! Seats %
|-
| bgcolor=| 
| align=left | Christian Democratic Union (CDU)
| align=right| 1,417,332
| align=right| 53.8
| align=right| 92
| align=right| 57.5
|-
| bgcolor=| 
| align=left | Social Democratic Party (SPD)
| align=right| 502,755
| align=right| 19.1
| align=right| 32
| align=right| 20.0
|-
| bgcolor=| 
| align=left | Party of Democratic Socialism (PDS)
| align=right| 269,420
| align=right| 10.2
| align=right| 17
| align=right| 10.6
|-
| bgcolor=| 
| align=left | New Forum (FORUM)
| align=right| 147,543
| align=right| 5.6
| align=right| 10
| align=right| 6.3
|-
| bgcolor=| 
| align=left | Free Democratic Party (FDP)
| align=right| 138,376
| align=right| 5.3
| align=right| 9
| align=right| 5.6
|-
! colspan=8|
|-
| bgcolor=| 
| align=left | German Social Union (DSU)
| align=right| 93,347
| align=right| 3.5
| align=right| 0
| align=right| 0
|-
| bgcolor=|
| align=left | Others
| align=right| 63,682
| align=right| 2.4
| align=right| 0
| align=right| 0
|-
! align=right colspan=2| Total
! align=right| 2,632,455
! align=right| 100.0
! align=right| 160
! align=right| 
|-
! align=right colspan=2| Voter turnout
! align=right| 
! align=right| 72.8
! align=right| 
! align=right| 
|}

Sources
 Statisches Landesamt Sachsen

Elections, 1990
1990 elections in Germany
October 1990 events in Europe